This is a list of countries by grape production from the years 2016 to 2020, based on data from the Food and Agriculture Organization Corporate Statistical Database. The estimated total world production for grapes in 2020 was 78,034,332 metric tonnes, up by 1.3% from 77,000,008 tonnes in 2019. China was the largest producer of grapes, accounting for 18.9% of global production. Italy came second at 10.5%, followed by Spain at 8.7%.

Production by country

>1,000,000 tonnes

100,000–1,000,000 tonnes

10,000–100,000 tonnes

<10,000 tonnes

Notes

References 

Production by country
Lists by country
Lists of countries by production
Food and Agriculture Organization
Grapes
Fruit production